Purpuroidea is an extinct genus of sea snails, marine gastropod molluscs in the clade Littorinimorpha.

Fossil record
These extinct sea snails lived between the Middle Triassic, Ladinian age (about 242 - 237 million years ago) and the Early Cretaceous, Turonian age (about 122 – 112 million years ago).  The fossils were found in Japan, Portugal, Ethiopia, France, Israel, Italy, Jordan, Kenya, Mexico, Romania, Saudi Arabia, Tanzania, Tunisia, Austria, Hungary, Iran and United States.

Species
Species within this genus include: 
 † Purpuroidea acatlana Alencaster and Buitron 1965
 † Purpuroidea applanata Kittl 1894
 † Purpuroidea cerithiformis Kittl 1894
 † Purpuroidea crassenodosa Kittl 1894
 † Purpuroidea praecursor Fischer et al. 2002
 † Purpuroidea rugosa Böhm 1895
 † Purpuroidea subcerithiformis Kittl 1894

See also
List of marine gastropod genera in the fossil record

References